The Interactive ALGOL 68 compiler for ALGOL 68 was made available by Peter Craven of Algol Applications from 1984. Then in 1994 from OCCL (Oxford and Cambridge Compilers Ltd) until 2004.

Platforms
 Inmos Transputer family
 Linux for Intel x86 computers
 OS/2 version 2.0 and onward
 SunOS-4.1.3 (Solaris 1) for SPARC-based computers
 Windows 95 and Windows NT for Intel

Extensions to standard ALGOL 68 
 Ability to include source code, and versions of source code.
 Nestable comments
 FORALL syntactic element for looping over arrays.
 ANYMODE a union of all MODEs known to the compiler, and hence dynamic typing.
 Enhanced coercions (casting) allowing stringer then "strong" coercions.
 Enstructuring automatically coerces a variable from type to struct(type)
 Conforming coerces UNION (THING, MOODS) to THING, but if that is not the current mood of the union, then a run-time error will be generated.
 Library interface to the native operating system and other libraries.
 The operator SIZE
 Pseudo-operators ANDTH and OREL, and ANF and ORF for Short-circuit evaluation of Boolean expressions.
 Arrays can be slices with stride to select a subset of elements.
 MOID is treated differently.

Example of code 
MODULE vectors
BEGIN
    INT dim=3;
    MODE VECTOR = [dim]REAL;
    OP + = (VECTOR a, b) VECTOR: ( VECTOR out; FOR i FROM LWB a TO UPB a DO out:=a[i]+b[i] OD; out ),
       - = (VECTOR a, b) VECTOR: ( VECTOR out; FOR i FROM LWB a TO UPB a DO out:=a[i]-b[i] OD; out ),
       DOT = (VECTOR a, b) REAL: ( REAL out:=0; FOR i FROM LWB a TO UPB a DO out+:=a[i]*b[i] OD; out );
END
KEEP VECTOR, +, -, DOT

Restrictions to the language from the standard ALGOL 68
 Variable, Modes and Operators must be declared before use.
 Anonymous procedure may use rows-declarer as a parameter.
 No transient subnames of flexible arrays.
 No formatted Transput (or format-texts).
 Restricted use of straightening of multiple values during Transput.
 Limited use of BYTES, BITS and BOOL.
 restricted use of labels to follow EXIT statements.

See also 
 ALGOL 68

References

External links
 "Interactive Algol 68" as an introduction to structured programming for students - Dec 1984
 Archived OCCL Home page
 Proprietary OCCL Algol 68 compiler for MSDOS
 OCCL Algol 68 white-paper

ALGOL 68 implementation